Zuleykha Safarova (born 27 November 1999) is an Azerbaijani tennis player.

Safarova made her WTA main draw debut at the 2015 Baku Cup, receiving a wildcard into the singles draw. She lost her first round match to Oleksandra Korashvili, 6–0, 6–0. She also lost in the first round of the doubles, partnering Amine Dik.

Safarova has represented Azerbaijan in international competitions since 2011, and was Champion of the Azerbaijan Republic for two years in a row (in 2013 and 2014). She competed at the 2017 Islamic Solidarity Games.

National representation

Billie Jean King Cup
Safarova made her Billie Jean King debut for Azerbaijan in 2021, while the team was competing in the Europe/Africa Zone Group III, when she was 21 years and 200 days old.

Billie Jean King Cup (1–2)

Singles (0–1)

Doubles (1–1)

References

External links
 

1999 births
Living people
Azerbaijani female tennis players
21st-century Azerbaijani women